Juan Ramon Brito (born November 7, 1977) is a Dominican former professional baseball catcher.

Brito last played for the Washington Nationals Triple-A affiliate, the Columbus Clippers in 2007.

Brito played in the 2006 World Baseball Classic for the Dominican Republic team.

External links

1977 births
Living people
Arizona Diamondbacks players
Charleston AlleyCats players
Columbus Clippers players
Dominican Republic expatriate baseball players in the United States
Dominican Republic people of Spanish descent
Gigantes del Cibao players
Gulf Coast Royals players
Kansas City Royals players
Lansing Lugnuts players
Leones del Escogido players
Major League Baseball catchers
Major League Baseball players from the Dominican Republic
Omaha Golden Spikes players
Omaha Royals players
People from Santiago de los Caballeros
Tucson Sidewinders players
Wichita Wranglers players
Wilmington Blue Rocks players
World Baseball Classic players of the Dominican Republic
2006 World Baseball Classic players
2009 World Baseball Classic players